Marcus D'Amico (4 December 1965 – 16 December 2020) was a film, television, and stage actor best known for his role as Michael "Mouse" Tolliver in the 1993 Tales of the City miniseries.

Born in Germany to an American father and a British mother, D'Amico was raised in the United Kingdom, then later appeared in various theatre productions.

Acting career
Early in his career, D'Amico had brief roles in Superman II (1980) and Stanley Kubrick's Full Metal Jacket (1987). He guest-starred in Jeeves & Wooster (1993), As Time Goes By (1994), and the black comedy Murder Most Horrid (1996). Other appearances included UK police drama The Bill (2002), also had a recurring role in the UK soap opera Family Affairs (2005).

D'Amico had stated a preference for stage acting, and among his various stage performances were a production of Shakespeare's Julius Caesar at London's Young Vic Theatre, and The Boys Next Door at London's Comedy Theatre. He was nominated for the 1992 Laurence Olivier Award for Best Actor for his portrayal of Louis in Angels in America.

In 2003, he appeared in The Lisbon Traviata at the King's Head Theatre in London. The following year he joined the cast of Mamma Mia! in London.

Tales of the City

Despite the success of his performance as Michael "Mouse" Tolliver in Tales of the City, D'Amico did not appear in the 1998 sequel More Tales of the City. (The role was recast with Paul Hopkins, who went on to appear in Further Tales of the City in 2001.) According to author Armistead Maupin:
 "Despite the rumors, it is not true that Marcus D'Amico wasn't invited back because of issues surrounding his sexuality. The production team met Marcus and he expressed 'ambivalence' about returning to the role of Mouse. The director felt it was important to find someone who would enthusiastically embrace the role."

However, he had referred to his past work on the Tales of the City miniseries as "Exhausting, enlightening and challenging."

When asked about fears of typecasting after appearing in the Angels in America stage play and the Tales of the City TV series, D'Amico stated in 2003, "I did get typecast in gay roles but it now no longer worries me."

Death
On 16 December 2020, D'Amico died of pneumonia at his home in Oxfordshire, England, aged 55. He was survived by his mother, two sisters, a half-brother, and a son and daughter.

Filmography

Film

Television

References

External links

1965 births
2020 deaths
British male film actors
British male television actors
People educated at Redroofs Theatre School
Actors from Frankfurt
British people of American descent